The Maritsa motorway, designated A4, is a motorway in Bulgaria, part of the Pan-European Corridor IV, between the Trakia motorway (A1), at the town of Chirpan, and Kapitan Andreevo, at the Turkish border.

The planned completion of the last remaining stretch of the motorway was in 2013, but a delay occurred and the complete motorway enterеd service in October 2015.

It is named after the Maritsa River.

History
In October 2010, a 31 km section of the Maritsa motorway between the towns of Harmanli and Lyubimets officially opened to traffic. The new interchange at Kapitan Petvo Voyvoda neighbourhood of Svilengrad, providing direct connection with the border crossing to Greece, also opened in October 2010. During construction, 6000-year-old Neolithic remains were found near Haskovo. The bypass of Kapitan Andreevo village in the border area entered service in August 2014. The construction of Haskovo-Harmanli section began in July 2011 and was completed on 28 May 2015. The last remaining section, between Chirpan and Haskovo, entered service on 29 October 2015.

The construction of the Chirpan-Haskovo and the Haskovo-Harmanli sections of the motorway were co-funded by EU funds allocated for Bulgaria, while a small section at the Turkish border was co-funded with a loan from the IBRD. Its route runs parallel to the existing major road 8, which is mainly two-lane and carried much of the road freight to and from Turkey and the Middle East. The completion of the Maritsa motorway attempts to reduce this congestion.

Exits

References

Motorways in Bulgaria